The St. Elizabeth College of Nursing (SECON) is a private university located in Utica, NY, United States. Established in 1904 as a single purpose, associate's degree program in Utica, New York. It was registered by the New York State Education Department (NYSED). The college was a product of the mission and tradition of St. Elizabeth Medical Center (SEMC). St. Elizabeth College of Nursing offers training to would-be qualified Registered Nurses.

History

It was registered by the New York State Education Department (NYSED) as St. Elizabeth Hospital School of Nursing and graduated its first class of seven in 1907.

Academics 

The program offers a two-year associate's degree in applied science (AAS) in nursing. St. Elizabeth College of Nursing is accredited by the Middle States Commission on Higher Education, fully accredited by The Accreditation Commission for Education in Nursing (ACEN), and registered by The University of the State of New York State Education Department. 

In 2008, St. Elizabeth College of Nursing (SECON) and SUNY Polytechnic Institute (SUNY Poly) announced a unique dual degree partnership,the 1+2+1 program designed for students who have shown excellent academic achievement and can meet the rigorous admission requirements for the program. During the freshmen year, the general education and science requirements are completed at SUNY Poly. In years two and three, the student will earn an associate degree while completing the nursing program at SECON leading to RN license. The fourth and final year of the program returns the student to SUNY Poly where a BS degree is earned (BSN). This allows the students to receive two nursing degrees in just four years.

Administration 

Kimberly Panko, DNP, RN (President)
Julie Wells-Tsiatsos, MSN, RNC-OB (Dean of Student and Faculty Development)

References

Nursing schools in New York (state)
Utica, New York
Universities and colleges in Oneida County, New York
Private universities and colleges in New York (state)